Pitimbu is a city in the state of Paraíba (Brazil), located in the microregion of the South Coast and metropolitan area of João Pessoa. According to the IBGE (Brazilian Institute of Geography and Statistics), in 2020 its population was estimated at 19,275 inhabitants, 46% in urban areas. Its area is 136 km ² representing 0.241% of the state.

The municipality contains a small part of the  Acaú-Goiana Extractive Reserve, a sustainable use conservation unit created in 2007.

See also
List of municipalities in Paraíba

References

Municipalities in Paraíba
Populated coastal places in Paraíba